Idiopathic craniofacial erythema is a medical condition characterized by uncontrollable and frequently unprovoked facial blushing.

Blushing can occur at any time and is frequently triggered by even mundane events, such as, talking to friends, paying for goods in a shop, asking for directions or even simply making eye contact with another person.

For many years, the cause of the condition was thought to be an anxiety problem, caused by a mental health disorder. However, in recent years experts in the field of the disorder believe it to be caused by an overactive sympathetic nervous system, an automatic response which sufferers have no mental control over. It is related to focal hyperhidrosis, more commonly known as excessive sweating, as it is caused by the same overactive nerves which cause excessive sweating. Sufferers of severe facial blushing commonly experience focal hyperhidrosis. Studies have also shown that patients with severe facial blushing or focal hyperhidrosis commonly have family members with one or both of the related disorders.

In popular culture
In Grey's Anatomy Season 2, Episode 3, a patient is diagnosed with idiopathic craniofacial erythema.
The female protagonist in the South Korean drama Heart to Heart suffers from uncontrollable blushing, that leaves her sociophobic.

Treatment 
A number of treatments are available.  The most successful non-invasive procedure is cognitive behavioural therapy (CBT), which attempts to alleviate the anxiety felt by sufferers.

In extreme cases a surgical procedure known as endoscopic transthoracic sympathicotomy (ETS) is available.  Pioneered by surgeons in Sweden, this procedure has recently become increasingly controversial due to its many potential adverse effects.  Patients who have undergone the procedure frequently complain of compensatory sweating and fatigue, with around 5% reconsidering getting the treatment.  ETS is now normally only considered in extreme cases where other treatments have been ineffective.

External links 

The New Yorker - CRIMSON TIDE - What is blushing?, No one knows for sure, but it can ruin your life by Atul Gawande.

Anxiety disorders